Coronado (Spanish for "Crowned") is a resort city located in San Diego County, California, United States, across the San Diego Bay from downtown San Diego. It was founded in the 1880s and incorporated in 1890. Its population was 20,192 in 2020, down from 24,697 in 2010.

Coronado is a tied island which is connected to the mainland by a tombolo (a sandy isthmus) called the Silver Strand. The explorer Sebastian Vizcaino gave Coronado its name and drew its first map in 1602. Coronado is Spanish term for "crowned" and thus it is nicknamed The Crown City. Its name is derived from the Coronado Islands, an offshore Mexican archipelago. Three ships of the United States Navy have been named after the city, including .

History
Prior to European settlement, Coronado was inhabited by the Kumeyaay, who sustained fishing villages on the peninsula in North Island and on the Coronado Cays. As American settlers moved into the area, the Kumeyaay were pushed out of Coronado, with the last six Kumeyaay families deported to Mesa Grande Reservation in 1902.

Coronado was incorporated as a town on December 11, 1890. The community's first post office predates Coronado's incorporation, established on February 8, 1887, with Norbert Moser assigned as the first postmaster. The land was purchased by Elisha Spurr Babcock, along with Hampton L. Story, and Jacob Gruendike. Their intention was to create a resort community, and in 1886, the Coronado Beach Company was organized. By 1888, they had built the Hotel del Coronado, and the city became a major resort destination. They also built a schoolhouse and formed athletic, boating, and baseball clubs.

In 1900, a tourist/vacation area just south of the Hotel del Coronado was established by John D. Spreckels and named Tent City. Spreckels also became the hotel's owner. Over the years, the tents gave way to cottages, the last of which was torn down in late 1940 or early 1941.

In the 1910s, Coronado had streetcars running on Orange Avenue. These streetcars became a fixture of the city until their retirement in 1939.

Geography

Geographically, Coronado is a tied island connected to the mainland by a tombolo known as the Silver Strand.  The Silver Strand, Coronado and North Island, form San Diego Bay. Since recorded history, Coronado was mostly separated from North Island by a shallow inlet of water called the Spanish Bight.  The development of North Island by the United States Navy prior to and during World War II led to the filling of the bight by July 1944, combining the land areas into a single body. The Navy still operates Naval Air Station North Island (NASNI or "North Island") on Coronado. On the southern side of the town is Naval Amphibious Base Coronado, a training center for Navy SEALs and Special warfare combatant-craft crewmen (SWCC). Both facilities are part of the larger Naval Base Coronado complex.  Coronado has increased in size due to dredge material being dumped on its shoreline and through the natural accumulation of sand.  The "Country Club" area on the northwest side of Coronado, the "Glorietta" area and golf course on the southeast side of Coronado, most of the Naval Amphibious Base Coronado, most of the Strand Naval Housing, and most of the Coronado Cays (all on the south side of Coronado) were built on dirt dredged from San Diego Bay.

On New Year's Day 1937, during the Great Depression, the gambling ship SS Monte Carlo, known for "drinks, dice, and dolls," was shipwrecked on the beach about a quarter mile (400 m) south of the Hotel del Coronado.

In 1969, the San Diego–Coronado Bridge was opened, allowing much faster transit between the cities than bay ferries or driving via State Route 75 along the Silver Strand. The bridge is made up of five lanes, one of which is controlled by a moveable barrier that allows for better traffic flow during rush hours. In the morning, the lane is moved to create three lanes going southbound towards Coronado, and in the evening it is moved again to create three lanes going northbound towards downtown San Diego.

Climate
According to the Köppen climate classification system, Coronado has a semi-arid climate, abbreviated "BSk" on climate maps.

Demographics

2010

The 2010 United States Census reported that the City of Coronado had a population of 24,697. The racial makeup of Coronado was 20,074 (81.2%) White, 1,678 (6.8%) African American, 201 (0.8%) Native American, 925 (3.7%) Asian, 101 (0.4%) Pacific Islander, 762 (3.1%) from other races, and 956 (3.9%) from two or more races. There were 3,354 Hispanic or Latino residents, of any race (13.6%).

2000
As of the 2000 census, there were 24,100 people, 7,734 households, and 4,934 families residing in the city. The population density was 3,121.9 inhabitants per square mile (1,205.3/km2). The racial makeup of the city was 84.40% White, 5.15% African American, 0.66% Native American, 3.72% Asian, 0.30% Pacific Islander, 3.14% from other races, and 2.63% from two or more races. Hispanic or Latino residents of any race were 9.83% of the population.

There were 7,734 households, out of which 27.0% had children under the age of 18 living with them, 54.0% were married couples living together, 7.4% had a female householder with no husband present, and 36.2% were non-families. 30.9% of all households were made up of individuals, and 13.3% had someone living alone who was 65 years of age or older.  The average household size was 2.27 and the average family size was 2.84.

In the city, 16.0% of the population was under the age of 18, 20.2% from 18 to 24, 29.3% from 25 to 44, 18.7% from 45 to 64, and 15.8% who were 65 years of age or older. The median age was 34 years. For every 100 females, there were 139.8 males.  For every 100 females age 18 and over, there were 149.1 males.

48.2% of those age 25 and over have a bachelor's degree or higher. According to a 2007 estimate, the median income for a household in the city was $91,748, and the median income for a family was $119,205.

Real estate in the city of Coronado is very expensive. According to a recent county-wide ZIP code chart published in The San Diego Union-Tribune in August 2006, the median cost of a single-family home within the city's ZIP code of 92118 was $1,605,000. In 2010, Forbes.com found that the median home price in Coronado had risen to $1,840,665.

Government and politics

Coronado is governed by a city council, which is presided over by a directly elected mayor.  The mayor and councilmembers serve 4-year terms.  Council designates one of its members as Mayor Pro Tempore.
 
Coronado had long been a Republican stronghold; in 2013, about 47% of voters were registered Republican, 25% Democratic, and 24% nonpartisan.

Prior to 2020, the resort city had voted for the Republican nominee in each presidential election since at least 1964. From 1968 to 1988, each Republican presidential candidate received over 70% of the vote. However the city has been trending Democratic in recent years, with each of the last four Republican candidates receiving less than 60% of the vote. In 2016, Donald Trump won Coronado with a plurality of the vote, and Hillary Clinton received the largest share of the vote for a Democratic candidate since at least 1964. In 2020, Democratic nominee and former vice president Joe Biden won Coronado with 51.50% of the vote, being the first Democratic presidential nominee to carry the city in decades.

Tourism

Tourism is an essential component of Coronado's economy.  This city is home to three major resorts (Hotel del Coronado, Coronado Island Marriott, and Loews Coronado Bay Resort), as well as several other hotels and inns. The downtown district along Orange Avenue, with its many shops, restaurants and theaters, is also a key part of the local economy. Many of the restaurants are highly rated and provide a wide variety of cuisine choices.

In 2008, the Travel Channel rated Coronado Beach as the sixth-best beach in America.

Hotel del Coronado

Coronado is home to the famous Hotel del Coronado, built in 1888 and long considered one of the world's top resorts. It has been designated as a National Historic Landmark and has hosted many notable guests, including American presidents George H. W. Bush, Jimmy Carter, Bill Clinton, Gerald Ford, Lyndon B. Johnson, Richard Nixon, Ronald Reagan, Franklin D. Roosevelt, and William Howard Taft, as well as sports, entertainment, and noted public figures: Muhammad Ali, Jack Dempsey, Thomas Edison, Magic Johnson, Charles Lindbergh, Willie Mays, Babe Ruth, Oprah Winfrey, and Robert Downey. Notable actresses Mary Pickford and Marilyn Monroe also stayed here.
 

"The Del" has appeared in numerous works of popular culture and was said to have inspired the Emerald City in The Wonderful Wizard of Oz. It is rumored that the city's main street, Orange Avenue, was Baum's inspiration for the yellow brick road. Other sources say Oz was inspired by the "White City" of the Chicago World's Fair of 1893. Author L. Frank Baum would have been able to see the hotel from his front porch overlooking Star Park. Baum designed the crown chandeliers in the hotel's dining room.

Because of the reported association with Oz, Coronado is often associated with the color green and is sometimes referred to as "The Emerald City". The colors of Coronado High are green and white; the Coronado city flag is a tricolor of green-white-green, with a crown in the middle.

The hotel is said to be haunted, with room 3372 being visited by the ghost of Kate Morgan. It served as the setting for a fictitious Florida hotel in the Billy Wilder classic comedy film Some Like it Hot.

Once owned locally, the Hotel Del is now owned by the Blackstone Group (60%), Strategic Hotels & Resorts Inc. (34.5%), and KSL Resorts (5.5%). When Strategic Hotels & Resorts Inc. bought its stake in 2006, the hotel was valued at $745 million; as of 2011, the hotel was valued at roughly $590 million.

Schools

Coronado Unified School District includes Coronado Middle School (CMS), Coronado High School, Silver Strand Elementary, and Village Elementary. Coronado School of the Arts, a public school-within-a-school, is located on the campus of Coronado High School.  Among the city's private schools are Sacred Heart Parish School and Christ Church Day School.

Economy

Top employers

According to the city's 2012 Comprehensive Annual Financial Report, the top 10 employers in the city are:

Notable people

Lisa Bruce – film producer
Johnny Downs – child actor who played "Johnny" in the Our Gang series of short films from 1923 to 1926
Christa Hastie - contestant on CBS Survivor Pearl Islands, Season 7, 2003 
Lloyd Haynes – actor and television writer, known for TV series Room 222
Mary Beardslee Hinds - American First Lady of Guam.
Mae Hotely – silent film actress who appeared in 85 films between 1911 and 1929
Jim Kelly – martial artist and actor, starred in Enter the Dragon with Bruce Lee
Genai Kerr - U.S. Water Polo Olympian and NCAA All-American
Anita Page – silent film actress
Sarah Roemer – actress and model, starred in 2007's Disturbia with Shia LaBeouf
Rodney Scott – Chief of United States Border Patrol
Tim Thomerson – actor and comedian, known for his portrayal of Jack Deth in the Trancers film series
Wende Wagner – actress
William Witney – film director

Music

Kevin Kenner – concert pianist
Mojo Nixon – musician and radio host
Nick Reynolds – founding member of The Kingston Trio
George Sanger – video game music composer
Paul Sykes – singer
Scott Weiland – former lead singer of Stone Temple Pilots and Velvet Revolver.
Tina Weymouth – bassist and vocalist of Talking Heads and Tom Tom Club

Commerce
 Charles T. Hinde – riverboat captain, businessman, original investor in Hotel del Coronado
 Doug Manchester – real estate developer and publisher of San Diego Union Tribune
 Orville Redenbacher – businessman behind eponymous brand of popcorn
 John D. Spreckels – transportation and real estate mogul
 Jonah Shacknai – (CEO of Medicis Pharmaceutical) and his girlfriend Rebecca Zahau
 Ira C. Copley – publisher, politician, and utility tycoon

Military

Army
William P. Duvall, U.S. Army major general, retired to Coronado
Townsend Griffiss, first American airman killed in Europe following the United States's entry into World War II

Marine Corps
General Joseph Henry Pendleton, USMC – Mayor of Coronado from 1928 to 1930, namesake of Camp Pendleton
Major General John H. Russell Jr., USMC – 16th Commandant of the Marine Corps, son of Rear Admiral John Henry Russell, USN and father of Brooke Astor, noted philanthropist.

Navy
Captain Ward Boston, USN – World War II Navy fighter pilot, then attorney for the Naval Board of Review which investigated the 1967 USS Liberty Incident
Admiral Charles K. Duncan – USN Supreme Allied Commander Atlantic
Admiral Leon A. Edney – USN
Admiral Thomas B. Fargo, USN – inspiration for fictional Captain Bart Mancuso in film The Hunt for Red October
 Alfred Walton Hinds - Naval officer and Governor of Guam.
John S. McCain Sr. – grandfather of Arizona senator and U.S. presidential candidate John McCain
Admiral George Stephen Morrison, USN – father of The Doors' lead singer, Jim Morrison
Commander Alan G. Poindexter, USN – NASA astronaut and Navy test pilot
Rear Admiral Uriel Sebree, USN – made two Arctic expeditions, was the second acting governor of American Samoa, and served as commander-in-chief of the Pacific Fleet
Commander Earl Winfield Spencer Jr., USN – first commanding officer of Naval Air Station San Diego
Vice Admiral James Stockdale, USN – Medal of Honor recipient and 1992 candidate for vice president with Ross Perot

Politics and government

Brian Bilbray – Republican politician and member of the United States House of Representatives
Alexander Butterfield – White House deputy assistant to Richard Nixon 1969–73, a key figure in Watergate scandal
Don Davis – Florida politician
Duncan Hunter – Congressman
M. Larry Lawrence – US Ambassador to Switzerland and owner of Hotel del Coronado
Cindy Hensley McCain – wife of Sen. John McCain
John McCain – U.S. Senator and 2008 Republican presidential candidate
Nathan Oakes Murphy – Republican delegate to the U.S. House of Representatives from Arizona Territory and 14th governor of the Territory
Dana Rohrabacher – Republican politician and member of United States House of Representatives
Donald Rumsfeld – former Secretary of Defense
George G. Siebels Jr. – first Republican mayor of Birmingham, Alabama, born in Coronado in 1913.
Wallis Simpson, Duchess of Windsor, American-born wife of abdicated King Edward VIII of the United Kingdom

Sports
Layne Beaubien – 2008 Olympic silver medalist in water polo
Cam Cameron – offensive coordinator for NFL's Baltimore Ravens, San Diego Chargers
Chad Fox – Major League baseball pitcher for several teams, including Florida Marlins 2003 World Series championship team
Ken Huff—former NFL player
Fulton Kuykendall – former NFL player
Jim Laslavic – former NFL linebacker
Gene Rock – former professional basketball player
Sven Salumaa – former professional tennis player
William Thayer Tutt – past president of International Ice Hockey Federation, member of Hockey Hall of Fame
Don Orsillo – play-by-play announcer for the San Diego Padres

Writers and poets
L. Frank Baum – author of The Wizard of Oz, which in part was written while he resided on Coronado. 
Landis Everson – poet

References

External links 

 
A Timeline of Coronado History - Coronado Historical Association and Coronado Museum
The Coronado Times Newspaper - Newspaper covering news, events, sports and people of Coronado, CA.

 
1890 establishments in California
Cities in San Diego County, California
Incorporated cities and towns in California
Populated coastal places in California
Populated places established in 1890
San Diego metropolitan area
Seaside resorts in California
Archipelagoes of the United States